Vllahat is a village in Vlorë County in southern Albania, 13 km northeast of Saranda and 2 km southeast of Delvina. It is part of the municipality Delvinë. The village is inhabited by Muslim Albanians.
The village is built on a mountain slope. It had a mosque. Nearby are the remainders of a medieval castle. To the south west of the village is the site of ancient Phoenice, which was declared an Archaeological Park in 2005.
There is little local employment apart from that provided by the State.

Geography and climate 
Vllahat is located within mountainous country though having a favourable geographical position as found between Delvina and Saranda, however there are areas that occupy a village and a small river that runs along the village and helps pay for agriculture. Vllahat also has some mineral groundwater resources.
The climate is Mediterranean (Csa) with warm and dry summers and cool and rainy winters.

Economy 
During the communist period the village was an important activity at the district level as well as nationwide. The then regime had given some relevance to small village and built in its midst some factories that were the pride of the village:
Flour factory
Oil factory
Jam factory
Factory sauce (Tomato Processing)
NPA (Artisan Processing Enterprise, clothing, upholstery, etc.)
Tailoring (military clothing, etc.)
Vllahat economy has its foundations in the development of agriculture (olives, grapes, vegetables) and livestock (cows, goats, sheep and chickens) and recently major developments and beekeeping but can not be left without mention small businesses village and the construction.

Religion 
The most common religion practiced in Albania is Islam though its society is known for its tolerance that existed until 1967 when religious traditions, religious practices were officially banned in Albania.  After the communist regime's collapse in the early 1990s, religious activities were resumed in 1991. Vllahat had a big mosque that was destroyed during the communist era under Enver Hoxha. In recent times it has a mosque and a vakëf, however Vllahat locals are often nonpracticing Muslims.

Sport 
Football is the sport most popular in the village of Vllahat. Some of the names that have played with the City team KS Delvina are Laert Hoxha, Gjergji Rexho and Taulant Rexho.

Demographics 
Vllahat's population is not very big. At the last years have immigrants from others cities and villages of Albania. Some of the biggest families and tribes recognized in the Vllahat are:
 Rexho
 Dervishi
 Kermezo
 Shino
 Basho
 Dano
 Habibi
 Sulejmani

Education 
4 class school and then the students continue in Delvinë
Kindergarten for children

References

Populated places in Delvinë
Villages in Vlorë County